Daniel Morgan Monument is a historic monument located at Spartanburg, Spartanburg County, South Carolina.  The statue was designed by John Quincy Adams Ward and the monument erected in 1881. The monument commemorates the centennial of the victory at the Revolutionary War Battle of Cowpens and its hero, General Daniel Morgan. The statue stands on a columnar granite shaft on an octagonal base designed by noted Charleston architect, Edward Brickell White. In 1960, the monument was moved about 100 yards across Morgan Square to its east end. However, in 2005 as part of a larger project involving the redesign and reconstruction of Morgan Square, the monument was returned to its original position at the corner of West Main and Magnolia Streets and its original orientation, facing Cowpens National Battlefield.

It was listed on the National Register of Historic Places in 1980.

References

American Revolutionary War monuments and memorials
Monuments and memorials on the National Register of Historic Places in South Carolina
Buildings and structures completed in 1881
Buildings and structures in Spartanburg, South Carolina
National Register of Historic Places in Spartanburg, South Carolina
1881 establishments in South Carolina